Solenoptera is a genus of beetles in the family Cerambycidae. , it contains the following species:

 Solenoptera adusta 
 Solenoptera bilineata 
 Solenoptera canaliculata 
 Solenoptera chalumeaui 
 Solenoptera cubana 
 Solenoptera dominicensis 
 Solenoptera furfurosa 
 Solenoptera helbi 
 Solenoptera intermedia 
 Solenoptera luciae 
 Solenoptera metallescens 
 Solenoptera michelii 
 Solenoptera parandroides 
 Solenoptera quadrilineata 
 Solenoptera rugosa 
 Solenoptera scutellata 
 Solenoptera sulcicollis 
 Solenoptera thomae 
 Solenoptera tomentosa 
 Solenoptera touroulti  
 Solenoptera vittata 
 Solenoptera zayasi

References

Cerambycidae genera
Prioninae